The International Law Association (ILA) is a non-profit organisation based in Great Britain that — according to its constitution — promotes "the study, clarification and development of international law" and "the furtherance of international understanding and respect for international law".

The ILA was founded in Brussels, Belgium, in 1873 and its present-day headquarters are in London. It is one of the oldest continuing organisations in the field of international law in the world and has consultative status, as an international non-governmental organisation, with a number of the United Nations-specialised agencies. Currently, the ILA has 20 active committees and 8 study groups that analyse specific facets of private and public international law. The findings of these groups are distributed to its members several times a year.

There are over 4,500 active ILA members around the world. The ILA's membership ranges from lawyers in private practice, academia, government and the judiciary, to non-lawyer experts from commercial, industrial and financial spheres, and representatives of bodies such as shipping and arbitration organisations and chambers of commerce.

The ILA holds biennial (once in two years) conferences and releases reports of the same for use of the international community. ILA members as well as members of the public are allowed to participate in the conference. The 78th Biennial Conference of the ILA took place in August 2018 in Sydney, Australia. The 79th Biennial Conference was held in Kyoto, Japan from 23–27 August 2020.

Archives of the ILA are held at the Institute for Advanced Legal Studies, and contain records dating back from its early years, right up to the current century. The ILA was initially called the "Association for the Reform and Codification of the Law of Nations", switching to the present title of the "International Law Association" in 1895.

Branches 
The ILA operates through branches which are regional but are often limited to one state only. There are currently 63 branches around the world. If there is not a branch available in a certain region, members of the public can become a member of ILA headquarters.

References

External links 
 International Law Association website

International law organizations
International organisations based in London
Legal organisations based in the United Kingdom
Legal research
Organisations based in the London Borough of Camden
Organizations established in 1873
Non-profit organisations based in the United Kingdom